The canton of Vallée de l'Homme is an administrative division of the Dordogne department, southwestern France. It was created at the French canton reorganisation which came into effect in March 2015. Its seat is in Montignac-Lascaux.

It consists of the following communes:

Aubas
Le Bugue
Campagne
La Chapelle-Aubareil
Coly-Saint-Amand
Les Eyzies
Fanlac
Les Farges
Fleurac
Journiac
Mauzens-et-Miremont
Montignac-Lascaux
Peyzac-le-Moustier
Plazac
Rouffignac-Saint-Cernin-de-Reilhac
Saint-Avit-de-Vialard
Saint-Chamassy
Saint-Félix-de-Reillac-et-Mortemart
Saint-Léon-sur-Vézère
Savignac-de-Miremont
Sergeac
Thonac
Tursac
Valojoulx

References

Cantons of Dordogne